Haya was a Mesopotamian god associated with scribal arts and possibly with grain. He was considered to be husband of Nisaba and father of Sud. He was also associated with Enlil, both as his father-in-law and an official in his service. He was worshiped in Ur, Umma, Kuara, Shaduppum and later on also in Assur. He is sparsely attested in literary texts, with only a single known hymn being dedicated to him. He also plays a minor role in the myth Enlil and Sud.

Name
Spellings with a breve are also in use in modern literature, including Ḫaya, Ḫaja and Ḫaia. The reading Hani is no longer considered to be correct. It is possible that sometimes the name Haya was written logographically as NAĜAR, though this sign could also be read as a variety of other theonyms, for example Alla and Ninildu.

It is commonly assumed Haya's name originated in a Semitic language. Miguel Civil suggested in 1983 that it was a cognate of the theonym Ea, though he noted these two gods were considered separate in Old Babylonian sources. He also remarked that Haya was already actively worshiped and appears in offering lists at a time when the only evidence of Ea were theophoric names. As of 2016, the proposal that a connection existed between Haya and Ea (and by extension with Eblaite Hayya) was still considered plausible, though it is not universally accepted. It is also uncertain if a homophonous element of names from Mari, written without the dingir sign used to designate theonyms, is related to Haya's name. Jean-Marie Durand argues that it referred to a different deity, though one whose name was also derived from the same root meaning "to live."

In the god list An = Anum, a secondary name of Haya is Lugalkisa'a (Lugalkisia), "lord of the retaining wall," though in the Old Babylonian forerunner to this composition and in offering lists from the Ur III period this theonym designates an unrelated doorkeeper deity instead.

Character
Ḫaya was a minor god, and is overall less well attested than his wife Nisaba. It is assumed that he shared many of her traits. He was associated with the scribal arts, and was described as a wise divine accountant and archivist. An unidentified tool, possibly a writing implement, giš dḫa-ià, was apparently named after him. Francesco Pomponio suggests that he functioned as the god of seals. 

Marcos Such-Gutiérrez characterizes Haya as a grain god. However, according to Mark Weeden the only evidence in favor of this interpretation are "etymological considerations," which he notes might not be fully reliable.

An Old Babylonian text from Nippur indicates that the peacock was referred to as dḫa-iàmušen, but no connection between this bird and any aspects of the god's character has been established so far.

Associations with other deities
Haya was regarded as the husband of Nisaba, the goddess of writing. The association between them is already attested in the Old Babylonian period. In the god list An = Anu ša amēli equates dḪa-a-a, according to Andrew R. George identical with Haya, with Nisaba, and explains this name as "Nisaba of riches" (ša maš-re-e). Unlike George, Dietz-Otto Edzard instead assumed that this theonym might have only been associated or confused with Haya's name. 

The daughter of Haya and Nisaba was the goddess Sud, who was equated with Ninlil and as such functioned as the spouse of Enlil. As a result, Haya was regarded as the father-in-law of this god. He was also his steward (agrig).

A hymn dedicated to Haya equates him with Indagara, the husband of the goddess Kusu. Indagara is sometimes treated in modern scholarship simply as an alternate name of Haya. However, the later god list An = Anum instead equates him with Ishkur. In the hymn, Indagara/Haya  and Kusu are collectively referred to as "the continual providers of the great meals of An and Enlil in their grand dining-hall."

In a god list from Emar which assigns Hurrian equivalents to Mesopotamian deities Haya corresponds to a poorly known Hurrian deity named dŠe-ra-am-mi-na. An alternate name of the Hattian grain goddess Kait, written ḫa-i-a-am-ma, might have been derived from Haya, though it might also have a presently unknown Hattic etymology.

Worship
The earliest known reference to Haya has been identified on a school tablet from Shuruppak the Early Dynastic period, though the context in which his name occurs on it remains uncertain. He also occurs in texts from Adab from the Old Akkadian period, though only in theophoric names, such as Lu-Haya and Ur-Haya. More attestations are available from the Ur III period, during which Haya is particularly well represented in texts from Ur. A hymn from the reign of Rim-Sîn I of Larsa also associates him with his city, and states that he was believed to dwell in the Ekišnugal, the temple of the moon god Nanna. Further locations he is attested in the third millennium BCE include Umma and Kuara. 

Excavations indicate that in the Old Babylonian period, a temple dedicated to Haya existed in Shaduppum, a small city located near modern Baghdad. After the end of this period his cult declined. It was later revived in Assyria. In the Neo-Assyrian period he came to be worshiped in Assur in a shrine located in  the temple of Ashur. He also presided over a procession of the "gods of Subartu" during a festival held in this city. A temple dedicated to Haya was built by Sennacherib. While the inscriptions mentioning this construction project come from Nineveh, the location of the structure itself is not known. 

The exorcism formula Gattung II invokes Haya alongside Nisaba, and describes him as the "solidifier of the boundaries of vast heaven."

Mythology
Haya plays a minor role in Mesopotamian literature. Only a single composition focused on him is known, a hymn from the reign of Rim-Sîn I of Larsa. Since it is only known from Ur, it has been proposed that it was composed to celebrate a visit of the aforementioned king in this city. It describes Haya's roles as a father-in-law of Enlil and as a divine accountant, mentions a connection between him and Ur, and implores him to bless the king. It also states that he is responsible for marking down the years of a king's reign of the "tablet of life," a mythical artifact used by gods to keep track of deeds of mortals, though in other compositions this item is instead associated with deities such as Nisaba, Ninimma, Nungal or Lammašaga.

Haya also appears in the myth Enlil and Sud, where he is mentioned as the father of the eponymous goddess. However, unlike Nisaba he does not partake in the consultations preceding Sud's marriage to Enlil.

References

Bibliography

External links

A hymn to Haia for Rim-Sin (Rim-Sin B) in the Electronic Text Corpus of Sumerian Literature
Enlil and Sud in the ETCSL

Knowledge gods
Wisdom gods
Agricultural gods
Mesopotamian gods